The 1880 United States presidential election in Ohio was held on November 2, 1880 as part of the 1880 United States presidential election. State voters chose 22 electors to the Electoral College, who voted for president and vice president.

Ohio was narrowly won by the Republican Party candidate and native son, James A. Garfield, won the state with 51.73% of the popular vote. The Democratic Party candidate, Winfield Scott Hancock, garnered 47.01% of the popular vote.

Results

Results by county

See also
 United States presidential elections in Ohio

References

Ohio
1880
1880 Ohio elections